Preston L. Grubbs is an American law enforcement officer who served as the principal deputy administrator of the Drug Enforcement Administration from 2017 until 2021.

Early life and education 
Grubbs was born in Pittsburgh, Pennsylvania. He received his Bachelor of Science degree in education from East Stroudsburg University and earned a Master of Business Administration from Robert Morris University in 1982.

Career 
Grubbs began his law enforcement career in 1979 with the Moon Township Police Department in Pennsylvania.

In 1983 Grubbs joined the Drug Enforcement Agency (DEA), and served as a DEA special agent in Washington, D.C., New York City, and Pittsburgh.

In 2017, Grubbs succeeded Robert W. Patterson as the principal deputy administrator of the DEA.

References 

Drug Enforcement Administration personnel
American law enforcement officials
People from Pittsburgh
Year of birth missing (living people)
Living people